The 40th Edition Vuelta a España (Tour of Spain), a long-distance bicycle stage race and one of the 3 grand tours, was held from 23 April to 12 May 1985. It consisted of 19 stages covering a total of 3,474 km. The race was won by Pedro Delgado of the Orbea cycling team.

Teams and riders

Pre-race favourites
The Spanish favourites for the general classification of the race were Pedro Delgado, Faustino Rupérez and Pello Ruiz Cabestany and the potential foreign favourites included Robert Millar – now known as Philippa York, Sean Kelly, Éric Caritoux, Peter Winnen and Gianbattista Baronchelli.

Route

Race Overview
In 1985 the Vuelta a España was still held in its April – May slot as the first of the three grand tours of the season.  A young Miguel Induráin took the lead on stage 2. Pedro Delgado won stage 6 to the Lagos de Covadonga and took over the race leader's jersey. Delgado lost the lead the following day to Pello Ruiz Cabestany. Robert Millar – now known as Philippa York then took the lead after the tenth stage, a stage won by Kelly.

Millar held the lead going into what has become one of the most infamous days in the history of the event, the penultimate day of the race, stage 18. Millar started the day 10 seconds ahead of Colombian Francisco 'Pacho' Rodríguez with Spain's Pello Ruiz Cabestany 65 seconds further behind in third. With the following day's last stage of the race little more than ceremonial, Millar said to the press, "I just have to stick to Pacho Rodríguez's wheel and it's done." A mountainous stage with three major climbs, Rodriguez tried but was unable to make a successful attack on Millar on the first climb of the day, the Morcuera. At the foot of the second climb, the Cotos, Millar punctured meaning once the puncture had been fixed Millar had to chase to get back to Rodrigues and Cabestany. By the time the riders reached the third climb, Los Leones, Millar had not only reached the main GC favorites, but was also taking their congratulations indicating their submission that the race over as a contest.

Millar however was unaware that Delgado, in the mountains around his Segovia hometown that he knew like the back of his hand, had launched an attack. None of the riders in Millar's group made him aware of the attack by Delgado – an elite specialist climber like Millar and in this case with the knowledge of the roads allowing him to descend aggressively. Delgado had support in his break from a second rider, José Recio. Delgado had started the day in sixth place and 6 minutes behind Millar. Working with Recio, Delgado was now nearly 7 minutes ahead of Millar on the road. Millar had none of his teammates in this group with the other contenders and was isolated. Recio won the stage and Delgado took overall lead of the race. With the race now referred to as "The stolen Vuelta', from the collusion among the Spanish speaking riders, Millar finished second overall. Peugeot directeur sportif, Roland Berland, said, "It's rotten, the whole peloton was against us. It seems a Spaniard had to win at all costs." L'Équipes Philip Bouvet stated, Millar was "the victim of a formidable Spanish coalition". Millar said afterwards, "I'll never return to Spain". In the television documentary on York, "The High Life", Millar criticised Berland for his handling of the situation on the road when Delgado attacked. Berland had been unable to negotiate support from other non Spanish speaking teams during the stage to give Millar the required support to chase down Delgado's lead.

In 1985 and 1986, a national team of the communist Soviet Union participated in the Vuelta. At the time, it was unusual for Soviet riders to participate in professional races.

1985 also saw the participation of the first U.S. professional team sponsored by Rank-Xerox and managed by Robin Morton, the first woman to manage a men's professional cycling team.

General classification (final)

References

 
1985 in road cycling
1985
1985 in Spanish sport
1985 Super Prestige Pernod International